The 1921 season was the tenth season for Santos FC.

References

External links
Official Site 

Santos
1921
1921 in Brazilian football